National Sawdust is a nonprofit music producer and venue in Brooklyn, New York with the goal of providing "composers and musicians across genres... a setting where they are given unprecedented support and critical resources essential to create and share their work." The organization is named after its building's original tenant, an early 20th century sawdust factory by the same name. It was founded in 2015 by composer Paola Prestini and attorney Kevin Dolan. Since then, National Sawdust has featured artists and ensembles including Philip Glass, Yo-Yo Ma, Nico Muhly, Yo La Tengo, Chris Thile, Pussy Riot, Caroline Polachek, Tanya Tagaq, Agnes Obel, Joan Tower, John Corigliano, the International Contemporary Ensemble, yMusic, Missy Mazzoli, Royce Vavrek, Du Yun, Karole Armitage, and Anthony Roth Costanzo.

History 
The National Sawdust Company was a sawdust factory in operation in industrial Williamsburg, Brooklyn during the 1930s. It closed in the late 20th century, leaving the space empty. After a zoning change in Williamsburg in the early 2000s, many historic industrial buildings in the area were demolished to make room for residential construction. By 2015, the National Sawdust Company building was one of few original structures remaining in Williamsburg, and it was surrounded by new developments.

Kevin Dolan, an attorney, organist, and philanthropist based in New York City with a passion for contemporary music, began planning to create a new concert hall in 2008. He asked composer Paola Prestini to join him as the Co-founder and Artistic Director of the organization.
Beginning in 2008, Bureau V Architecture worked alongside SLAB Architecture and acoustic design consultant Arup New York to remodel the interior of the space. The concert hall was designed based on computer modeling and acoustic tests. For example, to protect the space from outside noise and vibration, it was constructed as a concrete room suspended by a chassis of springs within the original building. Other than the addition of a mural by artist Eli Sudbrack, the exterior of the building was left unchanged; the words "National Sawdust Co.," dating back to the building's original tenant, are still visible from the outside.

In its inaugural performance on October 1, 2015, National Sawdust featured Philip Glass, Nico Muhly, Chris Thile, Glenn Kotche, and Eve Gigliotti. In 2016 alone, the organization hosted over 500 performances.

Strategy 
National Sawdust has the goal of providing "composers and musicians across genres... a setting where they are given unprecedented support and critical resources essential to create and share their work."

Every season, National Sawdust selects several curators to fill its calendar with a wide array of musical performances. These performances feature both up-and-coming and established artists from around the world, performing classical, experimental, electronic, rock and roll, folk, and other genres of music. In addition to providing a performance space for these musicians, the organization gives young artists the professional assistance necessary to grow their careers, including workshops, marketing assistance, and an artist in residency program. The Artists in residency program, introduced in the fifth season, includes commissions up to $15,000 and  access to the organization's performance space, the ability to curate concerts, and the opportunity to record their music. National Sawdust partners with Juilliard to debut the BluePrint Fellowship Program. In 2020, National Sawdust announced a New Works Commissions series, including award-winning composers whose work would be performed by the JACK Quartet and National Sawdust Ensemble.

Associated artists 

 Co-founder and Artistic Director Paola Prestini
 Composer Philip Glass
 Cellist Yo-Yo Ma
 Operatic soprano Renée Fleming
 Bryce Dessner of The National (band)
 Musician Meredith Monk
 Composer Joan Tower
 Composer Missy Mazzoli
 Composer Du Yun
 Composer David Lang
 Composer Nico Muhly
 Choreographer Karole Armitage
 Countertenor Anthony Roth Costanzo
 Rock band Yo La Tengo
 Chris Thile of Punch Brothers
 Glenn Kotche of Wilco
 Jeffrey Ziegler of the Kronos Quartet
 Russian punk-rock band Pussy Riot
 Composer John Corigliano
 The International Contemporary Ensemble
 Chamber ensemble yMusic
 Producer Beth Morrison
 Mexican jazz singer Magos Herrera
 Composer Theo Bleckmann
Composer-performer Sarah Hennies

References

2015 establishments in New York City
Music venues in New York City
Contemporary music organizations
Music venues
Nonprofit institutes based in the United States
Music organizations based in the United States